The Association of Commercial Television and Video on Demand Services in Europe (ACT) represents the interests of leading commercial broadcasters present across the European Union and beyond. The ACT member companies finance, produce, promote and distribute content and services benefiting millions of Europeans across all platforms. By offering a wide range of choice and variety to the viewer, commercial broadcasters are a leading source of entertainment and information to millions of European citizens.

History
The ACT was set up in 1989, when fewer than 100 broadcasters in the twelve member states of the European Community. With the occasional exception, most European countries had only ended the state monopoly of television broadcasting in the mid-1980s. Back then, the ACT had five founder members. As commercial television models proved popular with viewers, so many new channels were launched and ACT membership grew quickly. However, some of the key regulatory issues were already becoming apparent, with European rules adopted in 1989 for the first time on transfrontier television, advertising, programme quotas, and then separate rules negotiated for copyright in the early 1990s.

Mission
The ACT's role is to protect and to promote the interests of European private broadcasters. ACT engages with the European Union's institutions to achieve a balanced and appropriate regulatory framework which will encourage further investment and growth in the audiovisual sector. This allows the commercial audiovisual industry sector to deliver high-quality and diverse content, as well as trusted news, to viewers.
ACT monitors policy developments at European level and provides its members with regulatory expertise. ACT also engages with European decision makers and engages in a constant dialogue while providing them with the first-hand expertise about the audiovisual sector. Furthermore, ACT is a leading platform for its members to network and exchange ideas about latest policy developments and best practices. ACT represents the industry at external public events, institutional working groups, European and international organisations.

EU media policy
The ACT promotes and advocates the interests of its member companies in a wide range of media policy issues at European level. ACT activities aim at a balanced and appropriate regulatory framework which will encourage further investment and growth in the audiovisual sector. 
ACT responds to relevant consultations, inquiries and maintains dialogue with the European institutions. Key policy areas of focus are intellectual property, Audiovisual media law and data law.

Members
A+E Networks, AMC Networks International, Antenna Group, Atresmedia, beIN SPORTS, Canal+ Groupe, CME, Discovery, DPG Media, Gulli, ITV plc, LNK, Mediaset, Mediaset España, NBC Universal, Nordic Entertainment Group, NTV, ProSiebenSat.1 Media SE, RTL Group, Sanoma, SBS, SKY, TF1 Groupe, TV4 Media, TVI, United Media, ViacomCBS, Virgin Media Ireland, The Walt Disney Company.

Governance
 Guillaume de Posch, President, Member of the Board of Directors, RTL Group
 Christophe Roy, Chairman, Director of European Affairs, Canal+ Group
 Julia Smetana, Head of European regulatory affairs, Nordic Entertainment Group
 Melanie Amilhat, Director Government Relations Europe, Viacom/CBS
 Carolina Lorenzon, Director International Affairs, Mediaset
 Vincent de Dorlodot, Senior Vice President European Affairs, Head of Brussels Liaison Office (Bertelsmann) RTL Group SA
 Daniel Friedlander, Head of the EU office, Sky plc
 Lorraine Choquart, Senior Legal Counsel, Bein Sports
 Joanna O'Sullivan, Head of Media Policy and Regulatory Affairs, ITV plc
 Mario Rodríguez Valderas, Director General Corporativo, Mediaset España
 Anthony Level, Digital and European Chief Policy Officer, TF1 Group

ACT Team
 Grégoire Polad, Director General
 Małgorzata Szczodrowska, Director of Legal and Public Affairs
 Paola Colasanti, Head of information
 Alison Leonard, Office Manager
 Miruna Herovanu, Senior EU Policy Officer
 Erard Gilles, Senior EU Policy Officer

References
 www.acte.be
 @ACT_eu
 LINKEDIN

Television organizations
Organisations based in Brussels
Pan-European trade and professional organizations